There are 41 active Broadway theaters listed by The Broadway League in New York City, as well as eight existing structures that previously hosted Broadway theatre. Beginning with the first large long-term theater in the city, the Park Theatre built in 1798 on Park Row just off Broadway, the definition of what constitutes a Broadway theater has changed multiple times. The current legal definition is based on a 1949 Actors' Equity agreement with smaller theaters in New York to allow union members to perform, dividing theater spaces in the city into the system of Broadway and Off-Broadway seen today. Current union contracts clearly spell out if a production is "Broadway" or not, but the general rule is that any venue that mostly hosts legitimate theater productions, is generally within Manhattan's Theater District, and has a capacity over 500 seats is considered a Broadway theater. Previous to this legal demarcation a Broadway production simply referred to a professional theatrical production performed in a theater in Manhattan, and the theaters that housed them were called Broadway theaters.

While Broadway theaters are colloquially considered to be "on Broadway", only two active Broadway theaters are physically on Broadway (the Broadway Theatre and Winter Garden Theatre). The Vivian Beaumont Theater, located in Lincoln Center, is the furthest north and west of the active theaters, while the Nederlander Theatre is the southernmost and the Belasco Theatre is the easternmost space. The oldest Broadway theaters still in use are the Hudson Theatre, Lyceum Theatre, and New Amsterdam Theatre, all opened in 1903, while the most recently constructed theater is the Lyric Theatre, built in 1998. The largest of the Broadway theaters is the 1,933-seat Gershwin Theatre, while the smallest is the 597-seat Hayes Theater.

The beginning of Broadway theater can be traced to the 19th-century influx of immigrants to New York City, particularly Yiddish, German and Italian, who brought with them indigenous and new forms of theater. The development of indoor gas lighting around this same time period allowed for the construction of permanent spaces for these novel theatrical forms. Early variety, burlesque, and minstrelsy halls were built along Broadway below Houston Street. As the city expanded north, new theaters were constructed along the thoroughfare with family-friendly vaudeville, developed by Tony Pastor, clustering around Union Square in the 1860s and 1870s, and larger opera houses, hippodromes, and theaters populating Broadway between Union Square and Times Square later in the century. Times Square became the epicenter for large scale theater productions between 1900 and the Great Depression.

There is no standard date that is considered the beginning of Broadway-style theatre. A few landmarks that are considered the beginning of the Broadway era include the 1866 opening of The Black Crook at Niblo's Garden, considered the first piece of American style musical theater, the 1913 founding of the Actors' Equity Association, the union for New York Theater performers, and the 1919 Actors' Equity Association strike which gave actors and performers the recognition of a "fully legitimate professional trade". Mary Henderson in her book The City and the Theatre breaks down theater on the street Broadway into three time periods. "Lower Broadway" from 1850 to 1870, "Union Square and Beyond" from 1870 to 1899, and "Times Square: the First Hundred Years" (1900–2000). The current official Broadway/Off-Broadway division began with the 1949 Actors' Equity agreement.

Active Broadway theaters
The current definition of a Broadway theater is based on the 1949 Actors' Equity agreement dividing Broadway from Off-Broadway, but in the general psyche Broadway theaters are considered theatrical houses which host productions that can be nominated for Tony Awards. The American Theater Wing and The Broadway League, as presenters of these awards, have sole discretion to include or omit theaters from the list of Tony-eligible houses, but use the same standards and criteria as Actors' Equity does. The four main underlying criteria these organizations use to determine a Broadway theater are:

 Has a capacity of over 500 seats.
 Produces mostly legitimate theater productions.
 Is generally within Manhattan's Theater District (the Vivian Beaumont Theater is an exception)
 Is under an Actors' Equity "Production" contract if the theater is for-profit, or follows an Actors' Equity "LORT A" contract if the theater is run by a non-profit.

The following list contains the 41 theaters listed on the Internet Broadway Database, which is run by The Broadway League, that are considered active Broadway theaters and can host productions eligible for Tony Awards.

Existing former Broadway theaters
There are eight theaters that once were considered Broadway houses that are still standing but no longer present Broadway theatre.

Demolished Broadway theaters
Before the Tony Awards era the definition of "Broadway Theater" was more subjective. Variety, burlesque, minstrelsy halls, vaudeville, opera houses, hippodromes, and theaters all laid claim to the moniker. There are multiple historic moments considered the beginning of Broadway theatre as a style including:

 1866 – The Black Crook, considered the first piece of American style musical theater, opened at Niblo's Garden.
 1919 – The newly-formed actors' union, Actors' Equity, went on a month-long strike. This strike gave actors and performers the recognition of a "fully legitimate professional trade", framing this style of theater as not just being an art, but also a full trade with the actors as laborers.
 1949 – Actors' Equity came to an agreement with smaller theaters in New York to allow union members to perform for a "token salary" alongside non-union members in their houses. This created the current legal division between Broadway and Off-Broadway theaters.

The Internet Broadway Database lists all large venues in the general Theater District or Broadway areas of their time. The following lists organize all 95 demolished venues which hosted legitimate theater and appear on the Database. The theaters are organized into four lists based on when their last theatrical production opened compared to the three moments that may be considered the beginning of Broadway theatre. All theaters are listed by the name in use when their last theatrical production took place.

Post-1949 agreement
The 1949 Actors' Equity agreement is the largest defining moment in the classification of Broadway theaters. It granted smaller theaters in New York the ability to hire union members to perform, as long as they were paid a "token salary", alongside non-union members in their houses. This new union contract laid out a legal division between Broadway and the newly defined Off-Broadway theaters. The following list notes the 19 theaters that housed Broadway productions after this agreement went into effect and have since been demolished.

Post-1919 actors' strike
The 1919 Actors' Equity Association strike was a turning point for the profession of acting in New York City. Actors' Equity, the union for performers and actors, founded only a few years earlier in 1913, used this month-long strike to cement acting as a "fully legitimate professional trade", where the performers produced labor for a now-official industry, Broadway theatre. The following list notes the 34 theaters that housed Broadway productions after this strike ended but closed before the 1949 Actors' Equity agreement.

Post-1866 Black Crook production
In 1866 The Black Crook opened at Niblo's Garden, a theater on Broadway, near Prince Street. While there are strong arguments against it, this piece is considered the first piece of American-style musical theater. Whether or not it is truly the first musical, The Black Crook marks a turning point where Broadway became less about the variety, burlesque, and minstrel shows of the past, and began to be known more for the large-scale book musical which still reigns today.

The following list notes the 30 theaters that housed Broadway productions after The Black Crook opened but closed before the 1919 Actors' Equity strike.

Pre-musical
The following list notes the 12 theaters that housed Broadway productions from the beginning of theater in New York City but closed before the opening of The Black Crook.

Before the advent of the musical there were multiple theaters in New York that claimed the moniker of "Broadway", including an 1847 theater named the Broadway Theatre. While most early theaters were short-lived and housed touring productions from Europe, that changed with the construction of the Park Theatre in 1798. These newly-constructed, long-term theaters grew in number through the nineteenth century, clustered around Broadway, and began hosting a wide array of ethnic and new forms of entertainment.

Notes

References

External links 
 Internet Broadway Database listings for the current Broadway Theaters

 
Broadway (Manhattan)
Broadway
Theater District, Manhattan
Theatre in the United States